This is a list of Norwegian television related events from 1996.

Events
18 May - The 41st Eurovision Song Contest is held at the Oslo Spektrum in Oslo. Ireland wins the contest with the song "The Voice", performed by Eimear Quinn.
20 September - Debut of Stjerner i sikte, a series hosted by Jahn Teigen in which members of the public impersonate their favourite singers.
Unknown - The first series of Stjerner i sikte is won by Odd Einar Nordheim performing as Terence Trent D'Arby.

Debuts
20 September - Stjerner i sikte (1996-2002)

International
 Friends (Unknown)

Television shows

1990s
Sesam Stasjon (1991-1999)

Ending this year

Births

Deaths

See also
1996 in Norway